Emir Džinović (born 6 April 1963) is a Serbian Bosniak retired football defender who played in several clubs in Yugoslavia and Hungary.

Club career
Born in Priboj, SR Serbia, back then within Yugoslavia, he played in the Yugoslav First League with Serbian side FK Radnički Niš and Bosnian NK Čelik Zenica.

In 1992 with the beginning of the Yugoslav wars he moved to Hungary and after initially playing with Szekszárdi UFC, he then joined first-level club Budapesti VSC playing with them between the winter-breaks of 1993–94 and 1994–95. Later he also played with Hungarian clubs Paksi FC and Diósgyőri VTK.

International career
Džinović played for Yugoslavia U-21 team.

References

1963 births
Living people
People from Priboj
Serbian footballers
Yugoslav footballers
Association football defenders
FK Radnički Niš players
NK Čelik Zenica players
Yugoslav First League players
Szekszárdi UFC footballers
Diósgyőri VTK players
Nemzeti Bajnokság I players
Expatriate footballers in Hungary